Aghili-ye Jonubi Rural District is a rural district (dehestan) in Aghili District, Gotvand County, Khuzestan Province, Iran. At the 2006 census, its population was 7,690, in 1,513 families.  The rural district has 12 villages.

References 

Rural Districts of Khuzestan Province
Gotvand County